The 2021 GMR Grand Prix was an IndyCar motor race held on May 15, 2021 at the Indianapolis Motor Speedway Road Course. It was the 5th round of the 2021 IndyCar Series.

The 85-lap race was won by Ed Carpenter Racing's Rinus Veekay, clinching his first win of his Indycar career. IndyCar rookie Romain Grosjean won pole and finished second, his best ever finish in Indycar. Alex Palou finished 3rd for Chip Ganassi Racing.

Background 
The event was held over three days on May 13-15, 2021 at the road course of the Indianapolis Motor Speedway in Speedway, Indiana. This was the first time the venue featured in the 2021 season, later that year, Indycar would return for the Big Machine Spiked Coolers Grand Prix in August, and the eighth edition of this race, having first debuted in May 2014

The race was the 5th race of the 16-race calendar, held two weeks after the XPEL 375 at Texas Motor Speedway and two week prior to the 105th Indianapolis 500.

Entrants

Practice

Practice 1
Practice 1 took place at 9:30 AM ET on May 14, 2021.

Practice 2
Practice 2 took place at 1:00 PM ET on May 14, 2021.

Qualifying 
Qualifying took place at 4:30 PM ET on May 14, 2021.

Qualifying classification 

 Notes
 Bold text indicates fastest time set in session.

Warmup 
Warmup took place at 10:45 AM ET on May 15, 2021.

Race 
The race started at 2:30 PM ET on May 15, 2021.

Race classification

Championship standings after the race 

Drivers' Championship standings

Engine manufacturer standings

 Note: Only the top five positions are included.

References

External links 

Grand Prix of Indianapolis
GMR Grand Prix
GMR Grand Prix